Claudette Colbert (1903–1996) was an American actress who won the Academy Award for Best Actress in It Happened One Night (1934). 
Born Émilie (aka Lily) Claudette Chauchoin, she had early passions for a career in fashion design. Although she is more generally remembered for her film work, Colbert's show business career began on stage, and theatrical work remained part of her professional life for six decades. It was her friend, Anne Morrison, an aspiring playwright, who nudged her towards the acting profession. She chose the professional name of Claudette Colbert, using a family name three generations removed on her father's side.

From 1923, Colbert began acting in small plays, she continued as a stage performer for six decades, appearing both on Broadway and in other venues around the United States. In 1985, she appeared with Rex Harrison in the Frederick Lonsdale play Aren't We All? at the Brooks Atkinson Theatre on Broadway.

She made 65 films during her career. Colbert began picking up main parts in early movies, beginning silent film For the Love of Mike in 1927. Colbert was nominated twice more for an Academy Award − in 1935's Private Worlds and 1944's Since You Went Away − but won neither. Her final theatrical film was in 1961, as Troy Donahue's mother in Parrish.

Colbert made numerous appearances on radio, most notably in the Lux Radio Theater, and sporadically on other radio programs. Over the decades, she appeared on several television shows, with her final appearance being The Two Mrs. Grenvilles miniseries in 1985, in which she played the wealthy mother-in-law of Ann-Margret.

Colbert received a star on the Hollywood Walk of Fame on February 8, 1960.

Stage

Other theater
Island Fling (1951) in Westport, Connecticut
Diplomatic Relations (1965) in Miami, Florida 
A Community of Two (1974) in Philadelphia, Pennsylvania

Screen

Feature length credits

Short subjects

Radio appearances

Lux Radio Theater 

Between the years 1935 and 1954, Colbert made numerous appearances on the Lux Radio Theatre.
 "Holiday" (03/10/1935)
 "The Barker" (07/20/1936) 
 "The Gilded Lily" (01/11/1937)
 "Hands Across the Table" (05/03/1937)
 "Alice Adams (1935 film)" (01/03/1938)
 "It Happened One Night" (03/20/1939)
 "The Ex-Mrs. Bradford" (06/19/1939)
 "The Awful Truth" (09/11/1939)
 "Midnight" (05/20/1940)
 "His Girl Friday" (09/30/1940)
 "The Shop Around the Corner" (06/23/1941)
 "Skylark" (02/02/1942)
 "Once Upon a Honeymoon" (04/12/1943)
 "So Proudly We Hail!" (11/01/1943)
 "Magnificent Obsession" (11/13/1944)
 "Practically Yours" (08/27/1945)
 "Tomorrow is Forever" (05/06/1946)
 "Without Reservations" (08/26/1946)
 "The Egg and I" (05/05/1947)
 "Family Honeymoon" (04/04/1949, 04/23/1951)
 "Bride for Sale" (06/05/1950)
 "Thunder on the Hill" (11/09/1953)
 "The Corn Is Green" (05/17/1954)

The Screen Guild Theater　
She also participated in 13 episodes of radio's The Screen Guild Theater, between 1939 and 1952.

NBC radio show 
 "The Old Gold Comedy Theatre: The Palm Beach Story" (10/29/1944)
 "Bob Hope Show: Guest Star Claudette Colbert" (04/01/1952)

Television

Audio cassette
Gift from the Sea (1986)

Bibliography

Notes

External links
 
 

Colbert, Claudette